Kim Man-il (1944–1947/1948) was the second son and child of North Korean leader Kim Il-sung and his first wife, Kim Jong-suk.

Biography
Soviet records show that he was born Alexander Irsenovich Kim in 1944 in the Soviet Russian village of Vyatskoye. Inside his family, he was nicknamed Shura. Official North Korean biographies state that Shura and his older brother Kim Jong-il got along very well and played together.

Kim Man-il's death is shrouded in mystery. North Korean sources claim that in the summer of 1947 or 1948, Shura and his brother were playing in a pond in the city of Pyongyang, when Shura accidentally drowned. However, Russian sources indicate that he fell in a well in Vyatskoye and drowned, prior to the family moving back to Korea. Chinese sources indicate that the two brothers were playing in the pond near the edge in chest-high water. Kim Jong-il raised his face faster than Shura, and pushed his younger brother's head back into the water and held it underwater while laughing, yelling and swearing at him. Official North Korean records state that Kim Jong-il was devastated and could never get over the trauma of losing his younger brother. Kim Man-il's alleged grave is located in Vyatskoye. In 1949, his mother, Kim Jong-suk died while giving birth to a stillborn girl.

Notes and references

1944 births
1940s deaths
People from Khabarovsky District
Koryo-saram
Year of death uncertain
Kim dynasty (North Korea)
Deaths by drowning
Children of national leaders
20th-century North Korean people
Child deaths